Burford is a surname. Notable people with the surname include:

Anne Gorsuch Burford (1942–2004), American lawyer and politician
Byron Burford (1920–2011), American painter
Della Burford (born 1946), Canadian artist and writer
Ephraim John Burford (1905–1997), English historian and writer
George Burford (1875–?), American soccer coach
Gordon Burford (1919–2010), Australian model engine designer and manufacturer
Lolah Burford (died 2002), American writer
Nathaniel Macon Burford (1824–1898), American politician
Oliver Burford (born 1980), English cricketer
Oliver Lambert Alan Burford (1860–1923), officer of the Royal Australian Navy
Pamela Burford (born 1954), American writer
Priyanga Burford, British actress and writer
Robert Burford (1791–1861), English painter
Roger Burford (1904–1981), English screenwriter
Seth Burford (born 1979), American football player
Spencer Burford (born 2000), American football player
W. H. Burford & Sons, South Australian family soap business

See also
Bufford 
Bluford (disambiguation)
Bruford (disambiguation)